WNO may refer to the:
 Web News Observer, a news organization, Mysore, Karnataka, India.
 Washington National Opera, an opera company, Washington, D.C., U.S.A
 Welsh National Opera, a touring opera company, Cardiff, Wales
 World Nature Organization, a global intergovernmental organization currently located in Geneva, Switzerland